Ksenyia Tuhai (born 1 July 1995) is a Belarusian racing cyclist, who last rode for UCI Women's Team . She rode at the 2014 UCI Road World Championships.

References

External links

1995 births
Living people
Belarusian female cyclists
Cyclists from Minsk
Cyclists at the 2015 European Games
European Games competitors for Belarus